Holly Renee Magee (born March 30, 1959), also known by her married name Renee Tucker, is an American former competition swimmer who represented the United States at the 1976 Summer Olympics in Montreal, Quebec.  She competed in the preliminary heats of the women's 100-meter backstroke event and recorded at time of 1:06.44.

She was born to Jack and June Magee on March 30, 1959 in Texas City. Renee and her seven siblings spent much of their youth in the swimming pool and by the age of 17 with her hard work, drive and determination gained her a spot on the 1976 US Olympic swim team and the World Games the following year. Her extra-ordinary work ethic carried her through law school and a 25 + year career as a prosecutor and judge in the Harris County and Galveston County Criminal justice systems 

Currently she was a judge of the 337th District Court in Houston, Texas, immediately before her untimely death.

See also
 List of University of North Carolina at Chapel Hill alumni

References

1959 births
Living people
American female backstroke swimmers
North Carolina Tar Heels women's swimmers
Olympic swimmers of the United States
People from Texas City, Texas
Swimmers at the 1976 Summer Olympics